Sérgio Manuel Freitas Abreu (born 16 May 1967) is a French football manager and a former player who most notably played for Braga.

Club career
He made his professional debut in the Primeira Liga for Fafe on 11 September 1988 in a 0–4 loss against Vitória de Setúbal. Over his career he played 314 games on the top level of Portuguese club football.

References

1967 births
Living people
People from Bezons
French footballers
French people of Portuguese descent
Association football defenders
AD Fafe players
Primeira Liga players
F.C. Tirsense players
S.C. Braga players
C.D. Santa Clara players
G.D. Chaves players
S.C. Freamunde players
Liga Portugal 2 players
Leixões S.C. players
F.C. Felgueiras players
F.C. Lixa players
Portuguese football managers
C.D. Tondela managers
F.C. Oliveira do Hospital managers
Footballers from Val-d'Oise